Fazzio (Fatius, Fazius, Facius) of Verona (1190–1272) was an Italian saint. A native of Verona, he was a goldsmith who founded a charitable society in Cremona which worked with pilgrims and the sick. It was called the Order of the Holy Spirit. He made pilgrimages on foot to Rome and to Santiago de Compostella.

References

External links
Saints of January 18: Fazzio of Verona 
Fazzio of Verona

1190 births
1272 deaths
13th-century Christian saints
Medieval Italian saints